Linesville is a borough in Crawford County, Pennsylvania, United States. The population was 964 at the 2020 census, down from 987 at the 2019 census. The town derives its name from its founders, who included William Line (the grandson of a Swiss immigrant), who migrated from Carlisle, Pennsylvania, circa the early 1820s, and his relative, Amos Line, who was the town's surveyor and main proprietor. Amos Line "penetrated the western Pennsylvania wilderness as a member of the Pennsylvania Population Company in the early 1800s."

History
According to the town's history, Linesville was settled by Amos Line, who was born in Scotch Plains, New Jersey. "Line established a mill at the site in 1820. The village was laid out in 1825. It was first known as Line's Mills, but the name was changed to Linesville Station in 1864. It was not known as Linesville until 1883. It was incorporated from Pine Township on March 22, 1862.

Geography
Linesville is located in western Crawford County at  (41.656489, -80.424430). It is surrounded by Pine Township, a separate municipality.

The borough is located just north of the northeast end of Pymatuning Reservoir.

U.S. Route 6 passes through the center of Linesville, leading east  to Meadville, the Crawford County seat, and northwest then south  to Andover, Ohio. South Mercer Street provides a shorter route to Andover, leading south across the Linesville Spillway of Pymatuning Lake to Pennsylvania Route 285.

Climate

Demographics

As of the census of 2000, there were 1,155 people, 470 households, and 306 families residing in the borough. The population density was 1,510.4 people per square mile (586.8/km²). There were 501 housing units at an average density of 655.2 per square mile (254.5/km²). The racial makeup of the borough was 97.23% White, 0.69% African American, 0.69% Native American, 0.26% Asian, and 1.13% from two or more races. Hispanic or Latino of any race were 0.69% of the population.

There were 470 households, out of which 29.4% had children under the age of 18 living with them, 46.0% were married couples living together, 12.1% had a female householder with no husband present, and 34.7% were non-families. 28.5% of all households were made up of individuals, and 18.7% had someone living alone who was 65 years of age or older. The average household size was 2.45 and the average family size was 2.99.

In the borough the population was spread out, with 26.7% under the age of 18, 5.7% from 18 to 24, 25.9% from 25 to 44, 20.9% from 45 to 64, and 20.9% who were 65 years of age or older. The median age was 40 years. For every 100 females there were 100.5 males. For every 100 females age 18 and over, there were 90.8 males.

The median income for a household in the borough was $30,938, and the median income for a family was $34,038. Males had a median income of $31,296 versus $21,719 for females. The per capita income for the borough was $15,534. About 9.4% of families and 14.4% of the population were below the poverty line, including 20.8% of those under age 18 and 12.4% of those age 65 or over.

Linesville is within the Conneaut School District and is home to the district's administration offices, along with the Conneaut Area Senior High School and the Alice Shafer Annex.

Points of interest

There are several points of interest throughout the town, chiefly Pymatuning Lake and the Linesville Spillway. In warm weather, the spillway on the sanctuary (eastern) side is home to thousands of oversized carp, attracted by the bread thrown into the water by visitors; this is known as "The Place Where the Ducks Walk on the Fish", coined by local businessman Alpine Maclaine. The spillway is locally billed as "Pennsylvania's second most popular tourist attraction, after the Liberty Bell", and the logo of the Linesville Volunteer Fire Department used to be a duck standing on the back of a fish.

Pymatuning Lake is one of the largest man-made lakes in Pennsylvania. It was created in the 1930s as a Depression-era Civilian Conservation Corps (CCC) project. Linesville is also home to the University of Pittsburgh's Pymatuning Laboratory of Ecology.

Linesville is the birthplace of noteworthy traveler Winfield Line (Amos Line's great-great-grandson) who, in 1922-23 with his brother Francis, hiked/hitchhiked through every state in the Union. This pair of brothers later wrote a book entitled Foot by Foot Through the USA, A High Adventure Odyssey to Every State in the Union, which chronicled their journey.

Another minor point of interest is at the main intersection of the town (at its sole traffic light). On the Maclaine Building at the northwest corner is a sign reading "CHICAGO: 500 miles NEW YORK: 500 miles" (the true midpoint between the two is actually about a mile west).

At one time, Linesville was the onion capital of the United States, distributing its fragrant produce via the Erie & Pittsburgh Branch of the Pennsylvania Railroad.

Linesville made national news in November 2005 when 18-year-old Christopher Seeley was elected mayor, one of the youngest mayors to serve in a U.S. city to date.

References

Populated places established in 1824
Boroughs in Crawford County, Pennsylvania
1824 establishments in Pennsylvania